Nematolepis ovatifolia, is a small shrub with rusty coloured scales on the stems, smooth, glossy leaves and  white flowers in small clusters in summer.  It is endemic to New South Wales.

Description
Nematolepis ovatifolia is a small, dense shrub with more or less angled to terete stems covered in light rust coloured scales and sparsely dotted with warty glands. Flowering occurs in summer.

Taxonomy
This species was first formally described by Ferdinand von Mueller in 1855 and gave it the name Phebalium ovatifolium and the description published in Definitions of rare or hitherto undescribed Australian plants. In 1998, Paul G. Wilson changed the name to Nematolepis ovatifolia in the journal Nuytsia.

Distribution and habitat
Nematolepis ovatifolia grows in low woodland on granite ridges in the alpine regions of the Kosciuszko National Park.

References

Flora of New South Wales
ovatifolia
Taxa named by Ferdinand von Mueller